The 1981 South Carolina State Bulldogs football team represented South Carolina State University as a member of the Mid-Eastern Athletic Conference (MEAC) during the 1981 NCAA Division I-AA football season.

Schedule

Roster

References

South Carolina State
South Carolina State Bulldogs football seasons
Mid-Eastern Athletic Conference football champion seasons
Black college football national champions
South Carolina State Bulldogs football